Valli del Pasubio is a town in the province of Vicenza, Veneto, Italy. It is north of SP46.

The town is a tourist destination. On the background of Valli, from right to left, are the Pasubio massif (whose highest peak is Cima Palon, also called Monte Pasubion), the Baffelan-Tre Apostoli-Cornetto (Group of Sengio Alto) group and finally, on the left, the Carega group: all are destinations for excursions and for climbing.

Main sights
 Strada delle 52 Gallerie
 Giardino Botanico Alpino San Marco, an alpine botanical garden

References

Cities and towns in Veneto